Fandango is a term that originally described a style of folk dance and music.

Fandango may also refer to:

Arts and entertainment

Film
 Fandango, a 1928 film featuring Anita Garvin
 Fandango (1949 film), a French musical film
 Fandango, a 1969 film directed by John Hayes
 Fandango (1985 film), an American film directed by Kevin Reynolds
 Fandango, a 2000 German film directed by Matthias Glasner

Music
 Fandango (Mexican band), a 1984–1991 girl group
 Fandango (American band), a 1970s pop rock band
 Nick Simper's Fandango, a 1977–1983 British band featuring Nick Simper
 Fandango (Herb Alpert album), 1982
 Fandango (The Phoenix Foundation album), 2013
 Fandango!, an album by ZZ Top, 1975
 "Fandango", a song by DJ Quik from Trauma, 2005
 "Fandango", a song by Pain of Salvation from Remedy Lane, 2002

Other media
 Fandango (game show), a 1983–1989 American game show
 "Fandango", an 1891 poem by Vilhelm Krag
 Fandango Ballroom, the fictional dance hall in the musical Sweet Charity

Companies
 Fandango (Italian company), an entertainment company
 Fandango Media, an American ticketing company and provider of film, television, and streaming media information
 Casino Fandango, a hotel and casino in Carson City, Nevada, US
 Club Fandango, a live music promotions company based in Highbury, London, UK
 Label Fandango, a record label run by Club Fandango

People
 Fandango (wrestler), Curtis Jonathan Hussey (born 1981), American professional wrestler 
 Fanny Dango (1878–1972), British comedienne, singer and actress

Other uses
 Fandango (color), a colour in the fuchsia range
 Fandango on core, data corruption in computer memory due to a runaway pointer
 Fandango Pass, Warner Mountains, Modoc County, California, US
 Fandangos (snack), a brand of puffcorn sold in Brazil